Han Seung-woo (born December 24, 1994), known mononymously as Seungwoo, is a South Korean singer-songwriter, rapper, dancer and actor. He debuted as a member of South Korean group Victon in 2016. In 2019, he finished third on Produce X 101 and became a member of X1. He debuted as a solo artist in August 2020 with the extended play Fame.

Career

Early life 
Han was born on December 24, 1994, in Busan, South Korea. He is the youngest of three children, with two older sisters, the eldest being the singer and actress Han Sun-hwa. In 2010 he appeared on television when he visited his sister in Invincible Youth. He never considered entering the entertainment industry and was an avid athlete throughout elementary and middle school, until an injury forced him to quit. Despite initial opposition from his father, he successfully auditioned with A Cube Entertainment (now IST Entertainment) and moved to Seoul in 2014 after completing high school. He and Victon members Heo Chan, Kang Seung-sik and Choi Byung-chan were among the company's earliest batch of male trainees.

2016–2018: Debut with Victon 
Han was announced as a member of Plan A's upcoming boy group, referred to as "Plan A Boys", and participated in their pre-debut reality show Me and 7 Men. In November 2016, Han debuted as the leader of the group, with the group announcing its official name, Victon. He participated in lyric writing for three of the songs on their first EP Voice to New World, including the lead single "What Time is it Now?".

2019–present: Produce X 101, X1, and solo debut 
In 2019, Han competed in Produce X 101 and finished in third place with 1,079,200 votes, subsequently debuting in the project group X1. The contract for X1 was originally for five years, but Han returned to promoting with Victon following X1's disbandment in January 2020 due to a vote manipulation controversy.

In February, Han held a solo fan meeting and returned to promoting with Victon for their EP Continuous, released in March. From April 14 he and Victon member Kang Seung-sik co-hosted the radio show Blanket Kick (이불킥) which airs on Naver's streaming app Naver NOW. on Tuesday nights. Han hosted his final episode of Blanket Kick on July 13, 2021, and announced that fellow Victon member Heo Chan would be replacing him as co-host.

On August 10, 2020, Han made his solo debut with the EP Fame. "Sacrifice" is the EP's lead single, which Han wrote the lyrics for. The EP peaked at number two on the Gaon weekly album chart and sales surpassed 30,000 copies after the first day.

In September 2020, he competed in King of Mask Singer under the name "Blue Flag", making it to the second round of the competition.

In March 2021, Han was announced to be making his acting debut in the web drama Love #Hashtag.

Before his enlistment, Han returned with his second EP Fade on June 28, with "See You Again" serving as the lead single.

Personal life 
In June 2021, Han announced that he would enlist for his mandatory military service the following month. He reported to Nonsan Army Training Center in Chungcheongnam-do on July 28. He was discharged on January 27, 2023.

Discography

Extended plays

Singles

As lead artist

Soundtrack appearances

Songwriting credits  
Han has 33 songwriting credits registered with the Korea Music Copyright Association (KOMCA). All credits are adapted from KOMCA, unless stated otherwise.

Filmography

Web series

Television shows

References

External links

 

Living people
1994 births
Victon members
21st-century South Korean  male singers
IST Entertainment artists
K-pop singers
South Korean male idols
South Korean pop singers
South Korean contemporary R&B singers
South Korean hip hop singers
South Korean dance musicians
Musicians from Busan
Reality show winners